Rumor Has It (stylized as Rumor Has It... in the U.S. market) is a 2005 American romantic comedy film directed by Rob Reiner, and starring Jennifer Aniston, Kevin Costner, Shirley MacLaine and Mark Ruffalo. The concept of the screenplay by Ted Griffin is that a woman learns that her mother and grandmother may be the inspiration for the 1963 novel The Graduate by Charles Webb. The film received negative reviews from critics and was a box office disappointment, grossing $88.9 million against its $70 million budget.

Plot
In 1997, Sarah Huttinger, an obituary and wedding announcement writer for The New York Times, travels to Pasadena, California, for her sister Annie's wedding, accompanied by her fiancé Jeff Daly. When Sarah tells her grandmother, Katharine Richelieu, that she is unsure about getting married, Katharine lets slip that her late daughter, Sarah's mother Jocelyn, ran off to Cabo San Lucas a week before her own wedding.

Sarah visits her mother's best friend, Aunt Mitsy, who confirms that Jocelyn spent time with their prep school classmate Beau Burroughs the week before her wedding to Sarah's father Earl, and that Beau was friends with Charles Webb, the author of the novel The Graduate.

Jeff points out Sarah's parents were married just short of nine months before her birth, leading her to wonder if Beau might really be her biological father. Sarah also accuses her grandmother of being the inspiration for Mrs. Robinson, the older character who seduced the young man in The Graduate, who later ran away with Mrs. Robinson's daughter.

After the wedding, Sarah decides to fly to San Francisco, where Beau, now a highly successful and very wealthy Silicon Valley Internet wizard, is giving a speech. She meets him; and he admits to sleeping with her mother and grandmother, but assures Sarah he couldn't be her father because he is sterile after having suffered blunt testicular trauma while playing a soccer game in high school. The two go out for drinks, and the following morning Sarah wakes up in Beau's bed in his Half Moon Bay homethe third generation in her family to have sex with Beau.

Although guilt-stricken by her behavior, Sarah allows Beau to convince her to be his date at a charity ball, where she meets Beau's son Blake. Beau explains his wife wanted a biological child and was artificially inseminated with a sperm donor to become pregnant. Mollified, Sarah kisses Beau and is caught by Jeff, who has returned to California to find her after not hearing from her since she met Beau. An argument ensues and Jeff leaves her.

Dejected, Sarah returns to visit Katharine, who flies into a rage when she learns Beau has slept with her granddaughter. The two learn Annie suffered an anxiety attack while flying to her honeymoon and wants to talk to Sarah. Sarah tells her sister about the sexual relationship three generations of Richelieu/Huttinger women have had with Beau. She reassures Annie she truly is in love with her husband, Scott, and in doing so, realizes she's ready to marry Jeff.

It is also revealed that Earl was the one who accidentally caused Beau's testicular trauma. This makes Beau somewhat nervous to be around Earl, though Katherine is quite pleased by the revelation. Earl reveals to Sarah he always knew about Jocelyn and Beau's affair. Jocelyn returned to Earl because she loved him and he was someone with whom she could build a life. On the night she returned, Sarah was conceived. This explained the slightly early timing between her parents' wedding and her own birth.

Determined to win Jeff back, Sarah returns to New York City and tells her fiancé about her feelings. They reconcile on the condition that if they ever have a daughter, she will not be allowed anywhere near Beau. The film ends with Sarah and Jeff's wedding.

Cast

In addition, Kathy Bates appears, uncredited, in the role of Aunt Mitsy, while George Hamilton has a brief uncredited non-speaking cameo as himself.

Production
Screenwriter Ted Griffin was the initial director, but problems arose soon after principal photography began on July 21, 2004. The production fell several days behind schedule in the first week, and on August 5, Griffin fired cinematographer Edward Lachman from the project. Griffin was in turn let go by executive producer Steven Soderbergh the following day, and the production shut down in order to allow replacement Rob Reiner to make script, cast, and crew changes before resuming filming on August 18. Reiner replaced initial cast members Charlie Hunnam, Lesley Ann Warren, Tony Bill, and Greta Scacchi.

Soundtrack

Reception

Critical response
On review aggregator Rotten Tomatoes, the film holds an approval rating of 21% based on 116 reviews, with an average rating of 4.50/10. The site's critics consensus reads: "This riff on The Graduate has a solid cast, but is too lightweight to fully register." Metacritic gave the film a weighted average score of 35 out of 100 based on 29 critics, indicating "generally unfavorable reviews". Audiences polled by CinemaScore gave the film an average grade of "B" on an A+ to F scale.

A. O. Scott of The New York Times said, "I suppose Rumor Has It could be worse, though at the moment I'm at a loss to say just how. Ms. MacLaine and Mr. Costner are seasoned professionals, giving lackluster laugh lines more juice than they deserve, and Jennifer Aniston is as plucky and engaging as ever ... [but her] efforts are wasted in a movie that can't even seem to sustain interest in itself."

Roger Ebert of the Chicago Sun-Times observed, "The plot ... sounds like a gimmick. That's because it is a gimmick. But it's a good gimmick. And Rumor Has It works for good reasons, including sound construction and the presence of Kevin Costner ... a natural actor with enormous appeal ... This is not a great movie, but it's very watchable and has some good laughs. The casting of Aniston is crucial, because she's the heroine of this story, and ... has the presence to pull it off."

Mick LaSalle of the San Francisco Chronicle said, "The movie has that fatal triptych that is becoming Reiner's romantic-comedy signature: drippy sentiment, zany scenes that trivialize the characters and a horror of adventure ... needless to say, Rumor Has It fails as a successor to The Graduate. It fails artistically but also philosophically, in that it rebuts the spirit of the earlier film, while offering nothing attractive in its place."

Peter Travers of Rolling Stone awarded it one out of four stars, calling it a "comic turd" and adding, "The creepy script, by T.M. Griffin, is directed by Rob Reiner in a sleepwalking daze that Costner emulates by rotely repeating his performance in The Upside of Anger and in the process squeezing all the juice."

Brian Lowry of Variety said, "As muddled in most respects as its title, Rumor Has It... begins with an intriguing premise ... but it devolves into a bland romance spiced with too little comedy ... There's a germ of an idea here, but Reiner and Griffin race through the plot beats so rapidly that poor Sarah seldom has time to breathe, which also describes the movie ... [Aniston] never settles down enough to offer more than a shrill whine and pained expression."

Box office
The film opened at number 10 at the U.S. box office, on 2,815 screens on Christmas Day 2005, and earned $3,473,155 on that first day. It eventually grossed $43,000,262 domestically and $45,933,300 in international markets for a worldwide box office total of $88,933,562.

Home media
The film was released on DVD on May 9, 2006. It has grossed $21 million in US DVD sales.

See also
 List of American films of 2005

References

External links
 
 
 
 
 
 Rumor Has It at The Numbers

2005 films
2005 comedy films
2005 drama films
2005 romantic comedy-drama films
2000s American films
2000s English-language films
American romantic comedy-drama films
Films about journalists
Films about weddings in the United States
Films directed by Rob Reiner
Films scored by Marc Shaiman
Films set in 1997
Films set in Pasadena, California
Films set in San Francisco
Films shot in San Francisco
Films with screenplays by Ted Griffin
Village Roadshow Pictures films
Warner Bros. films